GS5  or GS-5 may refer to:

Samsung Galaxy S5, a 2014 smart phone
Gyakuten Saiban 5, a 2013 video game
GS-5, a pay grade in the General Schedule (US civil service pay scale)
Southern Pacific class GS-5, a steam locomotive
Gaisrinė sauga, 5 grupė (VGTU)
A PlayStation 5-themed Famiclone